Isla Verde (Spanish for green island) is an area of Carolina located east of Santurce (southwestern front of Piñones) next to Luis Muñoz Marín International Airport above the Teodoro Moscoso Bridge. The area lies just outside the eastern border of San Juan, capital of Puerto Rico that links with the college town of Río Piedras and the residential counterpart surroundings of Hato Rey, which includes the neighborhoods of Baldrich and University Gardens revolving around Golden Mile's financial district.

Geolocation

Isla Verde is also the name of the small island some 400 meters north of Punta Medio, with a size of just 2,518 m² (0.6 acres). It is the island that gave name to the district. The island falls within the Cangrejo Arriba barrio of Carolina. The district of Isla Verde is in fact the coastal area of Cangrejo Arriba. Isla Verde is bordered to the north by the Atlantic Ocean, to the west by the San Juan area of Punta las Marias and Ocean Park (Santurce), to the east by Loíza and to the south by Carolina and Rio Piedras (San Juan). Isla Verde, along with Condado, is one of the main tourist areas in the metropolitan area of Puerto Rico, hosting popular restaurants, hotels, casinos and resorts.

Neighborhood entanglements

The Luis Muñoz Marín International Airport, which many people mistakenly think is situated in San Juan, is located in Isla Verde, which belongs to the city of Carolina. For almost four years, the airport was given the unofficial title "Isla Verde International Airport", both by locals and visitors. Its residents tend to downplay the fact that the area is technically part of Carolina because Isla Verde shares the coastline with, and is akin to Ocean park and Condado which are both nearby and part of Santurce, one of the capital's historic districts.

Since the airport's creation and up until the September 11, 2001 attacks, aviation fans could enjoy a day at the beach, and at the same time, watch the aircraft land or take-off at a specially designed spot located near Piñones, Loíza. As a consequence of the attacks, the spot was closed to the general public because it might compromise airport security. Because of the airport's location in the Isla Verde area, some streets have had to be closed several times during visits by dignitaries and celebrities (most notably when a local has had overseas success in a competition). The area has a multitude of restaurants, hotels and high-priced homes as well as hotels and resorts.

Many celebrities have lived in Isla Verde's affluent areas, including some former members of the boy band Menudo, including Ricky Martin. During the late 1970s and early 1980s, it was home to one of the world's more popular discos of the time: The Flying Saucer was owned by Charlie Garcia who had promoted the Muhammad Ali vs. Jean Pierre Coopman fight at the Roberto Clemente Coliseum.  The Flying Saucer had a capacity of 800 people and over 10,000 were left outside opening night as DJ Orlando Torres del Pino had to force himself into the club. Isla Verde is home to a Cuban exile community centered on Casa Cuba, which is Puerto Rico's main Cuban social club.

Public Transportation

The Isla Verde bus terminal has routes to various other parts of San Juan:

 50 to Luis Muñoz Marín Airport
 45 to Luis Muñoz Marín Airport and Piñero
 40 to Piñero
  5 to Santurce and Old San Juan
 53 to Condado and Old San Juan

There are two bus systems serving the Isla Verde bus terminal: AMA, the main public transportation system and SITRAC which travels in the Isla Verde Hotel district. The public bus 5 and 53 which will take you from the Bus Terminal to Old San Juan (e.g. to El Morro) in roughly 1 hour.  
The SITRAC bus is free but only stays in Isla Verde.  The public bus costs 75 cents to ride.

Available at all times, taxis charge about $20 for a ride to the Condado and Old San Juan areas.

Subareas
Isla Verde has very wealthy areas but is not too far from the island's largest public housing project, Luis Llorens Torres Residential Complex, which is actually within San Juan. In March 2021, a higher police presence was planned for Isla Verde.

See also

 Piñones State Forest
 List of communities in Puerto Rico

References

Carolina, Puerto Rico
Neighborhoods in Puerto Rico